Kenneth or Ken Lee may refer to:

 Ken Lee (businessman) (1932–2007), co-founder of Bing Lee stores in Australia
 Ken Lee (linebacker) (born 1948), American football linebacker
 Kenneth B. Lee (1922–2010), Speaker of the Pennsylvania House of Representatives
 Kenneth E. Lee (born 1961), Pennsylvania politician
 Ken Lee (RAF officer) (1915–2008), British Second World War flying ace
 Kenneth K. Lee (born 1975), United States Circuit Judge of the United States Court of Appeals for the Ninth Circuit
 J. Kenneth Lee (1923–2018), civil rights attorney

See also
"Ken Lee", an English-phonetic cover of "Without You" by Badfinger, sung by Valentina Hasan on Bulgarian Music Idol